AC1 may refer to:

AC1, a candidate phylum of bacteria
AC1, a complexity class in circuit complexity
AC1 Sentinel, an Australian cruiser tank  
 AC-1, an IEC Utilization Category
Action Comics #1, containing the first appearances of several superheroes
 Atlantic Crossing 1, an optical submarine telecommunications cable system
Assassin's Creed, the first game in the Assassin's Creed series